Louise de Rohan (Louise Gabrielle Julie; 11 August 1704 – 20 August 1780) was a French noblewoman and Princess of Guéméné by marriage.

Biography

Born in Paris to Hercule Mériadec de Rohan and his wife Anne Geneviève de Lévis, as a member of the House of Rohan, she was entitled to the style of Highness. Her mother was the only child of Madame de Ventadour.

Her siblings included Louise Françoise, Duchess of La Meilleraye (married a grandson of Hortense Mancini and present ancestress of the Prince of Monaco) Jules, Prince of Soubise, Marie Isabelle, Duchess of Tallard, Governess of the Children of France. Her uncle was the Bishop of Strasbourg.

She was baptised with the names Louise Gabrielle Julie on 13 August. She was known as Louise de Rohan. Her uncle was the Bishop of Strasbourg, alleged son of Louis XIV.

Louise de Rohan was engaged to her cousin Hercule Mériadec de Rohan, who was son and heir of Charles III, Prince of Guéméné and Charlotte Élisabeth de Cochefilet. They were married on 4 August 1718 at Jouarre Abbey where her older sister Charlotte Armande was Abbess.

Louise presented her daughter, Charlotte Louise, to Louis XV and the queen, Marie Leszczyńska on 26 October 1737 at Fontainebleau. Two days later Charlotte Louise married the Italian Prince of Masserano. The Prince of Masserano was the Spanish ambassador in London.

She died at Chevilly, Loiret on 20 August 1780.

She owned the Manoir de Launay which she bought in 1747.

Issue

Charlotte Louise de Rohan (12 March 1722 – October 1786) - married Vittorio Filippo Ferrero-Fieschi (of the Fieschi family), Prince of Masserano, spanish ambassador, and had issue;
Geneviève Armande Élisabeth de Rohan, Abbess of Marquette (18 November 1724 – 1766) - never married;
Jules Hercule Mériadec de Rohan, Prince of Guéméné (25 March 1726 – 10 December 1800) - married Marie Louise de La Tour d'Auvergne (daughter of Charles Godefroy de La Tour d'Auvergne and Maria Karolina Sobieska) and had issue;
Marie-Louise de Rohan (1728 – 31 May 1737) - died in infancy;
''Louis Armand'' Constantin de Rohan, Prince de Montbazon (18 April 1731 – 24 July 1794) - married Gabrielle Rosalie Le Tonnelier de Breteuil, daughter of François Victor Le Tonnelier de Breteuil; no issue. Louis Armand was guillotined in the revolution;
Louis René Édouard de Rohan, Cardinal de Rohan (25 September 1734 – 16 February 1803) - Archbishop of Strasbourg; no issue;
Ferdinand Maximilien Mériadec de Rohan, Archbishop of Cambrai (7 November 1738 – 30 October 1813) - had illegitimate children with Charlotte Stuart, Duchess of Albany, daughter of Charles Edward Stuart and Clementina Walkinshaw

Ancestry

References and notes

Louise
18th-century French nobility
1704 births
1780 deaths
Louise
French Roman Catholics
Nobility from Paris